Celmisia (New Zealand aster or New Zealand daisy) is a genus of  perennial herbs or subshrubs, in the family Asteraceae. Most of the species are endemic to New Zealand; several others are endemic to Australia.

 Species and nothospecies

References

 PlantNET: New South Wales Flora Online: Genus Celmisia
 Flora of New Zealand: Taxa: Celmisia

Flora of Australasia
 
Asteraceae genera
Taxa named by Henri Cassini